Rodrigue Casimir Ninga (born 17 May 1993) is a Chadian professional footballer who plays as a striker for Cypriot club Anorthosis and the Chad national team.

Club career
Ninga was born in Mandoul, a region located in the southern part of Chad. Ninga was the top goalscorer of the Gabon Championnat National D1 in the 2013–14 season. He also won two consecutive Gabon Championnat National D1 titles with Mangasport in the 2013–14 and 2014–15 seasons.

In the summer of 2015, Ninga signed for Ligue 1 club Montpellier HSC, where he registered 7 goals and 4 assists in 26 Ligue 1 matches in his first season. On 1 October 2016, Ninga scored a hat-trick for Montpellier against Dijon in the 3–3 Ligue 1 away draw.

On 8 August 2019, Ninga joined Ligue 1 club Angers SCO by signing a three-year contract. On 22 September 2019, he came on as a substitute in the 69th minute and scored a hat-trick (and his first Ligue 1 goals for Angers) in the 4–1 Ligue 1 home win over Saint-Étienne to enable Angers to take provisional second place in the Ligue 1 table.

On 27 August 2020, he went to Sivasspor on loan.

Anorthosis Famagusta
On 12 July 2022, Ninga signed with Cypriot First Division club Anorthosis Famagusta on a two-year contract until 2024.

Career statistics

Club

International goals
Scores and results list Chad's goal tally first.

Note: Matches of the 2014 CEMAC Cup were not FIFA official matches, thus the goals from these matches are not counted as official.

Honours
Chad
CEMAC Cup: 2014

References

External links
 

1993 births
Living people
People from Mandoul Region
Association football forwards
Chadian footballers
Chad international footballers
Renaissance FC players
AS Mangasport players
Montpellier HSC players
Stade Malherbe Caen players
Angers SCO players
Sivasspor footballers
Anorthosis Famagusta F.C. players
Ligue 1 players
Ligue 2 players
Süper Lig players
Chadian expatriate footballers
Expatriate footballers in Gabon
Chadian expatriate sportspeople in Gabon
Expatriate footballers in France
Chadian expatriate sportspeople in France
Expatriate footballers in Turkey
Chadian expatriate sportspeople in Turkey
Expatriate footballers in Cyprus
Chadian expatriate sportspeople in Cyprus